Kelton Ted Gaëtan Agasson (born 31 August 1973) is a French former professional football player.

Career 
Agasson was born in Le Lamentin. He played on the professional level in Ligue 1 for Lille OSC, Ligue 2 for Red Star Saint-Ouen, Lille OSC and AS Saint-Étienne and Liga de Honra for S.C. Farense and C.D. Aves.

External links 
 Foot-National Profile
 Ted Kelton Agasson at anciensverts.com

1973 births
Living people
People from Le Lamentin
Association football midfielders
French footballers
French expatriate footballers
Expatriate footballers in Portugal
Ligue 1 players
Ligue 2 players
Red Star F.C. players
Lille OSC players
AS Saint-Étienne players
S.C. Farense players
ES Viry-Châtillon players
US Sénart-Moissy players
C.D. Aves players
FC Dieppe players